Jaan Priisalu (born 24 June 1967) is an Estonian cyber security official.

2011–2015, he was the Director General of Estonian Information System Authority.

In 2014, he was awarded by Order of the White Star, III class.

References

Living people
1967 births
Estonian civil servants